Moyemont is a commune in the Vosges department in Grand Est in northeastern France.

Geography
To the south of the village, more than half of the commune's 1,230 hectares are covered by forest (le forêt de Rambervillers). Two small streams, the Habu and the ForePrays (le devant Prays), both tributaries of the Mortagne flow towards the north-east, while in the south of the commune other streams flow to the south and south-east, reflecting commune's modestly elevated topography. The village itself is at the confluence of several small roads, with a lay-out in an irregular star shape resulting. The least minor of the roads crossing the village is the Route Departmentale RD32.

History

There is evidence of a settlement at Moyement during the Gallo-Roman period, when it was positioned along the road linking Strasbourg with Langres.

In 1114 it gets a mention in a surviving record as the Lordship of Moyemont, controlled by the Chapter of Saint-Dié. By 1751 Moyemont was listed under the bailiwick of Lunéville and in 1790 it was within the district of Épinal under the canton of Domèvre-sur-Avière.   The present administrative relationships are, in most respect, based on the administrative structures created across France in the wake of the French Revolution.

commune in the Vosges department in Grand Est in northeastern France.

See also
Communes of the Vosges department

References

Communes of Vosges (department)